Fifteen singles reached the Number One position in Spain in 1963. "Dame Felicidad" ("Give me Happiness") by Enrique Guzmán remained in the top spot for eight weeks between August and October, and "Tous les garçons et les filles" (Françoise Hardy) was top for a total of nine weeks over three different periods.

Chart history

See also
1963 in music
List of number-one hits (Spain)

References

1963
Spain Singles
Number-one singles